Microschooling is the reinvention of the one-room school house, where class size is typically smaller than that in most schools (15 students or less in a classroom) and there are mixed-age level groupings. Generally, microschools do not meet all 5 days of the school week, and their schedules look different than a traditional public or private school. Classes can be taught using a flipped classroom approach, a form of blended learning, though not all microschools focus on technology in the same ways.  Classes tend to be more impactful due to meeting fewer times in the week. Classes may use instructional methods, ranging from traditional lecture-based approaches to hands-on and activity-based approaches.  Microschooling is viewed as a replacement for various school paradigms that are standard worldwide.

Microschooling is seen as being in between homeschooling and private schooling and is designed to offer a full-year of education at around $10,000 or often less. Its growing popularity stems from a general dissatisfaction of how schools (public and private) often structure their content. Homeschool families are drawn to the idea because of how microschooling establishes a core set of learning experiences similar to what might be found in normal schools that parents can then expand on and individualize for their children. Private and public school parents see microschooling as an affordable option that provides their children with a more worldly education that some might consider as constructivism in approach.

History 
Microschooling began in the UK as small independent schools, privately funded by groups of like minded parents, with no dedicated premises (home rotation) led by a full-time paid tutors (as opposed to homeschooling where a parent tutors their own child (or children)). Cushla Barry first coined the term microschooling in February 2010. It has also been explored by education writers like Anya Kementz, who spoke about the return of the one-room school house

United Kingdom 
It is set to be a rising trend in the UK, where getting your child into a good local school is becoming increasingly difficult due to underfunding and overcrowding. The UK Conservative party alluded to the concept of microschooling in 2007 with their concept of Pioneer schools.

New York City
In the early 2000s, as the cost of private school became increasingly exorbitant and availability of spaces declined, a movement of preschool co-ops and homeschool co-ops started by teachers and parents started emerging to directly meet the needs of children in the community. CottageClass is one company which supports the creation of microschools, with fifteen schools operating in Brooklyn alone.

San Francisco Bay Area 
Since 2010, microschooling has evolved in scope from the simple idea of privately funded groups of learners to a full concept of a specialized learning environment dedicated to ensuring individual understanding of the subjects being taught. Students attend a school for up to 2 days a week and cover a more diverse set of topics and subjects than would otherwise be accessible in small, private groups.

Pedagogy 
In order to provide the same amount of learning in fewer days, microschooling has of late become associated with a movement in education to provide students with hands-on and activity-based learning that often pairs experts with the students in the classroom. The overall approach might be considered constructivism in approach. Lecture, worksheets, and book work are often eschewed in favor of carefully constructed activities that are designed to help the learner to develop their own personal understanding. In this model, teachers will typically avoid making definitive statements of understanding to the students and will instead help the students work towards their own understanding. It is uncommon to see letter grading in microschools. Microschools will often pair suggested extracurricular activities, field trips, programs, books, and other multimedia with their classes so that students will have a broader exposure to content than what is just offered in the classroom.

Learning outcomes 
Despite the relatively short time frame that microschools have existed, there has been evidence  that shows students are often learning more concepts in the classroom in a shorter time frame. It is unclear whether or not those students are retaining those concepts over longer periods of time due to the short time frame that microschooling has existed.

National standards 
As a potential point of controversy, microschooling often does not consider national standards as relevant to the educational needs of students and instead seeks to develop content and curriculum that helps create a passion for learning in the students that focuses on real-world knowledge and skills. Educators involved with microschooling often feel that standards hamper their flexibility to develop engaging and enriching curriculum. Microschools will often choose their own set of standards and it can readily be shown that many of those standards, but not all, map to the Common Core. In many cases the content covered by microschools can exceed the standards provided by the state, particularly in regard to the four key content areas of mathematics, language arts, history, and especially science.

See also
 One-room school
 Homeschooling
 New Gains Academy, Glendale, Arizona

References

Alternative education